This is a list of populated places in the Grand-Duchy of Luxembourg. It is based on the official database of the National Administration of Topography (Administration du cadastre et de la topographie - ACT).

Furthermore it provides the Communes and Cantons every settlement is located in.

The Luxembourgish names are based on the names recommended by the National Council for the Luxembourgish Language (Conseil permanent pour la langue luxembourgeoise - CPLL).

Settlement types 

The settlement type describes the entity as which a settlement is administered.

The twelve towns of Luxembourg have special legal status and are appointed by law. In general, these are larger settlements of a few thousand people and of regional importance.

Villages are medium-sized settlements of usually a few hundred people. Every settlement classified as "official locality" (localité officielle) in the National Postal Register but not being appointed as town by law is classified as village in this list.

In Luxembourg, villages and towns are signposted by bilingual yellow streetsigns showing the official name (often in French) and the luxembourgish name of the locality.

Lieux-dits are named inhabited places that are smaller than villages and often only have few inhabitants. They might be isolated hamlets or farms that are located outside of villages, but are often administered as part of the nearest locality. In this list, settlements fitting none of the criteria of towns or villages are classified as "lieu-dit".

In Luxembourg, Lieux-dits are signposted by monolingual white streetsigns, showing only the luxembourgish name of the locality.

Populated places in Luxembourg

References 

 Liste des localités avec coordonnées - data.public.lu

See also

List of cities in Luxembourg
Outline of Luxembourg

 
Luxembourg
populated places